The Hudson Project is a 345 kV AC powerline for the power supply of New York City from PSEG's Bergen Generating Station, in Ridgefield, New Jersey. It was laid by Anbaric Development Partners.

Overview
It consists of a HVDC back-to-back station with a transmission rate of 660 MW and DC voltage of 180 kV at 1 Railroad Avenue in Ridgefield, New Jersey, which is connected by a 230 kV line with the nearby substation.

After travelling through the Edgewater Tunnel, the cable enters the Hudson River at Edgewater and runs along the eastern side of the river parallel to the shore until piers 92 and 94, where it enters Manhattan.

Construction of the link started in May 2011 and was completed in June 2013.

This cable was completely removed, and replaced. The Ariadne, 130 Meter, Cable ship, performed the submarine cable replacement. (summer of 2017)

See also
Anbaric Transmission
Neptune Cable
Bayonne Energy Center

References

External links 
Hudson Project website
MasterElectricTransmissionPlanforNYC 2009

Buildings and structures in Bergen County, New Jersey
Buildings and structures in Manhattan
Edgewater, New Jersey
Electric power transmission systems in the United States
Fairview, Bergen County, New Jersey
Hudson River
Ridgefield, New Jersey
New York City infrastructure
Electric power transmission systems in New Jersey
Submarine power cables
Port of New York and New Jersey
Consolidated Edison
Public Service Enterprise Group
Energy infrastructure completed in 2013
2013 establishments in New Jersey
2013 establishments in New York City